Holy Trinity Church is a small Gothic Revival Anglican church located in East Ferry, County Cork, Ireland. It was completed in 1830. It is dedicated to the Trinity. It is the church for Gurranekennefeake parish, part of the Diocese of Cork, Cloyne, and Ross. It is included on Cork County Council's Record of Protected Structures.

History 
The site on which Holy Trinity is built has hosted a chapel since 1302. The site was donated for the construction of the current church by Richard Goold Adams. The current church was designed by William Atkins, and built between 1865 and 1867. Holy Trinity was consecrated in 1867.

Architecture 
Holy Trinity is built in High Gothic style. The church is noted for its polychromatic interior and exterior, being built of limestone; red sandstone; and white, yellow, and red brickwork. The design was influenced by the works of William Burges. It features a number of notable stained glass windows.

In culture 
Holy Trinity church is featured in the 1873 watercolour 'Knight Templar' near East Ferry Church, 4th Sept 1873, part of Richard Peterson Atkinson's 'Knight Templar' series.

References

Notes

Sources 

 

Architecture in Ireland
Churches in the Diocese of Cork, Cloyne and Ross
19th-century Church of Ireland church buildings